Pachai Nirame  is a 2008 Indian Tamil-language mystery thriller film directed and produced by Karkki. The film stars Yugendran, Saran Sathya, Rajasekar, Nanditha Jennifer and Preethi Varma, with Vadivelu, Majeet Khan, Ravikumar, Karikalan, Chandrasekhar, Ajay Rathnam, Rashmi Radhakrishnan, Suresh, and Singamuthu playing supporting roles. The film had musical score by Sreeram Selva and was released in 2008.

Plot

The film begins with the discovery of a skeleton of a woman in a minister's garden. Inspectors Majeet Khan (Majeet Khan) and Ravikumar (Ravikumar) take charge of the case, and they suspect that the skeleton might be Asha (Preethi Varma), who had disappeared two years ago. They then interrogated her friend Sowmya.

Two years ago, Manoj (Yugendran), Jawahar (Saran Sathya), Santhosh (Rajasekar), Shanthi (Nanditha Jennifer), Asha, and Sowmya were college mates in Chennai. They went to a picnic in a remote village, and they stayed in the bungalow of the drug dealer Santhanapandian (Ajay Rathnam). Manoj and Shanthi were in love with each other, while Asha finally accepted Santhosh's love proposal. Meanwhile, a mysterious serial killer roamed around their bungalow, and one day, Asha disappeared without leaving a trace. Inspector Murugaperumal (Karikalan) investigated the mysterious disappearance of Asha and suspected Santhanapandian's maid Velu of abducting her. Murugaperumal beat Velu up in the police lockup, and the following day, Velu was found dead.

Back to the present, the two inspectors suspect Manoj of committing the murders, and they put wanted posters of him all over town. A worried Manoj then meets Jawahar, and Jawahar reveals him that he is the murderer.

In the past, Jawahar fell in love with Kavitha (Rashmi Radhakrishnan), and he married her during the college holidays with the blessings of his father (Chandrasekhar). Later, Kavitha had an affair with her relative Suresh (Suresh), and one day, Jawahar's father caught them in a public place. To save her marriage, Kavitha blamed Jawahar's father for misbehaving with her, and the heartbroken Jawahar's father left their house. Thereafter, Jawahar caught his wife in their marital bed with Suresh. Suresh fled the place, and Jawahar killed his wife in cold blood. When he tried to bury her in his garden, he found the dead body of his father, who was murdered by Kavitha and Suresh. After this incident, Jawahar killed Suresh and slowly became a psychopath and began to kill the adulterers. He even murdered Shanthi and Asha upon thinking that they were adulterers, but they were actually innocent women who had sincerely loved their boyfriends.

The film ends with Manoj killing Jawahar.

Cast

Production
Karkki made his directorial debut with Pachai Nirame under his own banner of Thirupathi Films. Yugendran, Saran Sathya (also known as Jawahar), Rajasekar, Nanditha Jennifer, and Preethi Varma were selected to play the lead roles. Vadivelu's unreleased comedy portions in another film was used in the film and he filed a complaint to the makers of the film.

Soundtrack

The film score and the soundtrack were composed by Sreeram Selva. The soundtrack features 5 tracks.

References

2008 films
2000s Tamil-language films
Indian mystery thriller films
2000s mystery thriller films
2008 directorial debut films